This is a list of articles in medieval philosophy.

A 
 Abd al-Karīm ibn Hawāzin al-Qushayri
 Abhinavagupta
 Abner of Burgos
 Abraham bar Hiyya
 Abraham ibn Daud
 Abū Hayyān al-Tawhīdī
 Abu Rayhan Biruni
 Abu Yaqub Sijistani
 Acharya Hemachandra
 Active intellect
 Actus et potentia
 Actus primus
 Actus purus
 Adalbertus Ranconis de Ericinio
 Adam de Buckfield
 Adam de Wodeham
 Adam of Łowicz
 Adam Parvipontanus
 Adam Pulchrae Mulieris
 Adelard of Bath
 Adi Shankara
 Ahmad Sirhindi
 Al-Farabi
 Al-Ghazali
 Al-Jahiz
 Al-Kindi
 Al-Shahrastani
 Al Amiri
 Alain de Lille
 Albert of Saxony (philosopher)
 Albertus Magnus
 Alcuin
 Alessandro Achillini
 Alexander Bonini
 Alexander Neckam
 Alexander of Hales
 Alfred of Sareshel
 Alhazen
 Altheides
 Amalric of Bena
 André of Neufchâteau
 Anselm of Canterbury
 Anselm of Laon
 Antonio Beccadelli
 Arab transmission of the Classics to the West
 Athīr al-Dīn al-Abharī
 Auctoritates Aristotelis
 Augustine Eriugena
 Augustine of Hippo
 Averroes
 Averroism
 Avicenna
 Ayn al-Quzat Hamadani

B 
 Barlaam of Seminara
 Bartholomew of Bologna (philosopher)
 Bartolommeo Spina
 Basilios Bessarion
 Bernard of Chartres
 Bernard of Clairvaux
 Bernard of Trilia
 Bernard Silvestris
 Berthold of Moosburg
 Boethius
 Boetius of Dacia
 Bonaventure
 Brethren of Purity
 Brunetto Latini
 Byzantine philosophy
 Byzantine rhetoric

C 
 Cahal Daly
 Caigentan
 Cardinal virtues
 Carolus Sigonius
 Catherine of Siena
 Celestial spheres
 Cesare Cremonini (philosopher)
 Choe Chung
 Christine de Pizan
 Condemnations of 1210–1277
 Consolation of Philosophy
 Constantine of Kostenets
 Contra principia negantem disputari non potest
 Convivio
 Cosmographia (Bernard Silvestris)
 Credo ut intelligam
 Cristoforo Landino

D 
 Daniel of Morley
 Dante Alighieri
 David ben Merwan al-Mukkamas
 De divisione naturae
 Demetrius Chalcondyles
 Denis the Carthusian
 Divine apathy
 Doctrine of the Mean
 Dōgen
 Dominicus Gundissalinus
 Duns Scotus
 Dynamics of the celestial spheres

E 
 Early Islamic philosophy
 Elia del Medigo
 Ethica thomistica
 Étienne Tempier
 Eustratius of Nicaea
 Euthymius of Athos
 Everard of Ypres

F 
 Fakhr al-Din al-Razi
 Federico Cesi
 Five wits
 Francesco Filelfo
 Francis of Marchia
 Francis of Mayrone
 Francis Robortello
 Francisco de Vitoria
 Francisco Suárez
 Franciscus Bonae Spei
 Fujiwara Seika

G 
 Gabriel Biel
 Galileo Galilei
 Garlandus Compotista
 Gasparinus de Bergamo
 Gaunilo of Marmoutiers
 Gemistus Pletho
 George of Trebizond
 Gerard of Abbeville
 Gerard of Bologna
 Gerard of Brussels
 Gerard of Cremona
 Gerardus Odonis
 Gersonides
 Gilbert de la Porrée
 Giles of Lessines
 Giles of Rome
 Giovanni Pico della Mirandola
 Godfrey of Fontaines
 Gonsalvus of Spain
 Great chain of being
 Gregor Reisch
 Gregory of Rimini
 Grzegorz of Stawiszyn
 Guarino da Verona
 Guido Terrena
 Guillaume Pierre Godin
 Guru Nanak Dev

H 
 Haecceity
 Haribhadra
 Hayy ibn Yaqdhan
 Henry Aristippus
 Henry Harclay
 Henry of Ghent
 Herman of Carinthia
 Hermannus Alemannus
 Hervaeus Natalis
 Heymeric de Campo
 Hibat Allah Abu'l-Barakat al-Baghdaadi
 Hisdosus
 Hōnen
 How many angels can dance on the head of a pin?
 Hugh of Saint Victor
 Hugh of St Cher
 Hylomorphism

I 
 Ibn al-Nafis
 Ibn al-Rawandi
 Ibn Arabi
 Ibn Bajjah
 Ibn Hazm
 Ibn Khaldun
 Ibn Masarrah
 Ibn Taymiyyah
 Ibn Tufail
 Immanuel the Roman
 Insolubilia
 Intellectualism
 Intelligible form
 Ioane Petritsi
 Ippen
 Isaac Abrabanel
 Isaac Israeli ben Solomon
 Isagoge
 Isotta Nogarola

J 
 Jacob ben Nissim
 Jacopo Zabarella
 Jakub of Gostynin
 Jan Szylling
 Jayatirtha
 Jean Buridan
 Jean Capréolus
 Jedaiah ben Abraham Bedersi
 Jien
 Jinul
 Jiva Goswami
 Jocelin of Soissons
 Johannes Scotus Eriugena
 John Argyropoulos
 John Blund
 John de Sècheville
 John Dumbleton
 John Halgren of Abbeville
 John Hennon
 John Italus
 John Major (philosopher)
 John of Damascus
 John of Głogów
 John of Jandun
 John of Mirecourt
 John of Paris
 John of Salisbury
 John of St. Thomas
 John Pagus
 John Peckham
 Joseph Albo
 Joseph ben Judah of Ceuta
 Judah ben Moses Romano
 Judah Halevi
 Julius Caesar Scaliger

K 
 Kitabatake Chikafusa
 Kwon Geun

L 
 Lambert of Auxerre
 Lambertus de Monte
 Leo the Mathematician
 Leon Battista Alberti
 Leonardo da Vinci
 List of scholastic philosophers

M 
 Madhusūdana Sarasvatī
 Madhvacharya
 Maimonides
 Manuel Chrysoloras
 Marcus Musurus
 Marsilio Ficino
 Marsilius of Inghen
 Marsilius of Padua
 Matheolus Perusinus
 Matthew of Aquasparta
 Medieval philosophy
 Meister Eckhart
 Michael of Ephesus
 Michael of Massa
 Michael Psellos
 Michał Falkener
 Miskawayh
 Mohammad Ibn Abd-al-Haq Ibn Sab’in
 Moralium dogma philosophorum
 Mu'ayyad fi'l-Din al-Shirazi
 Muhammad ibn Muhammad Tabrizi
 Muhammad ibn Zakariya al-Razi
 Myōe

N 
 Nahmanides
 Nasir al-Din al-Tusi
 Nasir Khusraw
 Neo-medievalism
 Niccolò Machiavelli
 Nichiren
 Nicholas of Autrecourt
 Nicholas of Kues
 Nicole Oresme
 Nikephoros Choumnos

O 
 Odo of Châteauroux
 Omar Khayyám
 Oxford Calculators
 Oxford Franciscan school

P 
 Palla Strozzi
 Paolo da Pergola
 Passive intellect
 Patriarch Gennadios II of Constantinople
 Paul of Venice
 Peripatetic axiom
 Peter Abelard
 Peter Aureol
 Peter Ceffons
 Peter Crockaert
 Peter de Rivo
 Peter Helias
 Peter Lombard
 Peter of Auvergne
 Peter of Capua the Elder
 Peter of Corbeil
 Peter of Poitiers
 Peter of Spain
 Peter Olivi
 Petrarch
 Petrus Aureolus
 Petrus Ramus
 Photios I of Constantinople
 Pierre d'Ailly
 Pierre de Bar
 Pietro Alcionio
 Pietro d'Abano
 Policraticus
 Porphyrian tree
 Praepositinus
 Primum movens
 Problem of universals
 Proslogion

Q 
 Qotb al-Din Shirazi
 Quiddity
 Quinque viae

R 
 R. De Staningtona
 Rabia al-Adawiyya
 Radulfus Ardens
 Radulphus Brito
 Ralph of Longchamp
 Ralph Strode
 Ramanuja
 Ramism
 Ramon Llull
 Remigius of Auxerre
 Renaissance
 Renaissance humanism
 Renaissance philosophy
 Richard Brinkley
 Richard Kilvington
 Richard of Campsall
 Richard of Middleton
 Richard of Saint Victor
 Richard Rufus of Cornwall
 Richard Swineshead
 Richard Wilton
 Robert Alyngton
 Robert Cowton
 Robert Grosseteste
 Robert Holcot
 Robert Kilwardby
 Robert of Melun
 Robert Pullus
 Rodolphus Agricola
 Roger Bacon
 Roland of Cremona
 Roscelin of Compiègne
 Roscellinus
 Rota Fortunae

S 
 Scholasticism
 School of Saint Victor
 Scotism
 Sensus communis
 Sentences
 Seosan
 Shahab al-Din Suhrawardi
 Shinran
 Siger of Brabant
 Simon of Faversham
 Simon of Tournai
 Solomon ibn Gabirol
 Sophismata
 Sperone Speroni
 Stephen of Alexandria
 Substantial form
 Sum of Logic
 Summa
 Summa contra Gentiles
 Summa Theologica
 Summum bonum
 Supposition theory
 Synderesis

T 
 Temporal finitism
 Term logic
 Theodore Metochites
 Thierry of Chartres
 Thomas Aquinas
 Thomas Bradwardine
 Thomas Gallus
 Thomas of Sutton
 Thomas of Villanova
 Thomas of York (Franciscan)
 Thomas Wilton
 Thomism
 Thought of Thomas Aquinas
 Timeline of Niccolò Machiavelli

U 
 Ulrich of Strasburg
 University of Constantinople
 Univocity
 Urso of Calabria

V 
 Vācaspati Miśra
 Vijnanabhiksu
 Vincent Ferrer
 Vital du Four
 Voluntarism (metaphysics)
 Voluntarism (theology)

W 
 Walter Burley
 Walter Chatton
 Walter of Bruges
 Walter of Mortagne
 Walter of St Victor
 Walter of Winterburn
 Wang Yangming
 William Crathorn
 William de la Mare
 William of Alnwick
 William of Auvergne (bishop)
 William of Auxerre
 William of Champeaux
 William of Conches
 William of Falgar
 William of Heytesbury
 William of Lucca
 William of Moerbeke
 William of Ockham
 William of Saint-Amour
 William of Sherwood
 William of Ware
 Works by Thomas Aquinas

Y 
 Yi Hwang
 Yohanan Alemanno

Z 
 Zhang Zai
 Zhu Xi

 
Medieval